Boskovštejn is a municipality and village in Znojmo District in the South Moravian Region of the Czech Republic. It has about 200 inhabitants.

Sights
The main landmark is the Boskovštejn Castle. It was built as a water fortress in the early 16th century. Around 1600, it was rebuilt into a castle. At present the building served as a bicycle museum.

References

Villages in Znojmo District